The following highways are numbered 271:

Canada
Manitoba Provincial Road 271
 Quebec Route 271
Saskatchewan Highway 271

Japan

 Odawara-Atsugi Road (Route 271)

United States
 Interstate 271
 U.S. Route 271
 Alabama State Route 271
 California State Route 271
 Florida State Road 271 (former)
 Georgia State Route 271
Hawaii Route 271 (former)
 K-271 (Kansas highway) (former)
Kentucky Route 271
 Minnesota State Highway 271
 Montana Secondary Highway 271
 New Mexico State Road 271
 New York State Route 271
 Oklahoma State Highway 271A
 Pennsylvania Route 271
 South Dakota Highway 271
 Tennessee State Route 271
 Texas State Highway 271 (former)
 Texas State Highway Loop 271
 Farm to Market Road 271 (Texas)
 Utah State Route 271
 Virginia State Route 271
 Washington State Route 271
 Wyoming Highway 271